Claire Horrent (21 August 1909 – 16 August 1998) was a French freestyle swimmer. She competed at the 1928 Summer Olympics in the 100 m and 4 × 100 m relay events and finished fifth in the relay.

References

French female freestyle swimmers
Swimmers at the 1928 Summer Olympics
Olympic swimmers of France
1909 births
1998 deaths
20th-century French women